The Commonwealth War Graves Commission (CWGC) aims to commemorate the UK and Commonwealth dead of the World Wars, either by maintaining a war grave in a cemetery, or where there is no known grave, by listing the dead on a memorial to the missing.

The majority of the memorials commissioned by the CWGC to commemorate the missing dead of World War I were erected in Belgium and France along or near to the Western Front. The following list is of the CWGC memorials to the missing of the First World War erected elsewhere, both in the UK and other regions of the worlds, limited to those that list more than 1000 names each.

The total from the 'numbers' column below of those listed on these memorials is 138,062.

List of memorials

See also
 List of war cemeteries and memorials on the Gallipoli Peninsula
 List of Commonwealth War Graves Commission World War II memorials to the missing

References

Commonwealth War Graves